The Pico House is a historic building in Los Angeles, California, dating from its days as a small town in Southern California.  Located on 430 North Main Street, it sits across the old Los Angeles Plaza from Olvera Street and El Pueblo de Los Ángeles Historical Monument.

History

Pío Pico, a successful businessman who was the last Mexican Governor of Alta California, ordered construction of a luxury hotel in the growing town.  The architect was Ezra F. Kysor, who also designed the Cathedral of Saint Vibiana, and it was constructed between 1869 and 1870.  The resulting Italianate three storey, 33-room hotel, dubbed Pico House (or Casa de Pico) was the most extravagant and lavish hotel in Southern California, and its opening was cause for much celebration.  It had a total of nearly 80 rooms, large windows, a small interior court, and a grand staircase.  In the days of the hotel's primacy the courtyard featured a fountain and an aviary of exotic birds.  The structure forms three sides of a trapezoid whose open end immediately abuts the adjacent Merced Theatre, thus forming the courtyard.  The back of the hotel faces Sanchez Street, where the large gate used by supply wagons and other large vehicles can still be seen.

Its time in the spotlight did not last very long.  By 1876, the Southern Pacific Railroad had linked the city with the rest of the country and more residents and businessmen began pouring in.  Pio Pico himself started having financial troubles, and lost the hotel to the San Francisco Savings and Loan Company.

In 1882, the hotel was so crowded with guests that Manager Dunham secured 30 rooms on the opposite side of the street, "and still the cry is more room."
The business center of the city began to move south and, by 1900, the condition of the building began to decline and it was operated as a lodging house until it was acquired by the El Pueblo de Los Ángeles Historical Monument.  Parts of this building were renovated in 1981 and 1992.  The ground floor is occasionally used for exhibits and other events.

Landmark

The Pico House is listed as a California Historical Landmark (No. 159) and a National Historic Landmark as a part of the Los Angeles Plaza Historic District (NPS-72000231).

In popular culture
The rear of Pico House was used in the TV show The Mentalist. It is used as the headquarters of the fictional California Bureau of Investigation and is frequently seen during the show.
On January 7, 2011, the building was featured on Travel Channel's Ghost Adventures, with special guests Kane Hodder, R.A. Mihailoff, and Rick McCullum.

References
Notes

External links

California Historic Landmarks, California Office of Historic Preservation, Accessed October 26, 2006.
Pico House, USC Dept. of Geography, Accessed November 11, 2010.

Hotels in Los Angeles
Buildings and structures in Downtown Los Angeles
El Pueblo de Los Ángeles Historical Monument
Museums in Los Angeles
California Historical Landmarks
History of Los Angeles
Historic district contributing properties in California
Los Angeles Historic-Cultural Monuments
National Register of Historic Places in Los Angeles
Hotel buildings completed in 1870
1870 establishments in California
19th century in Los Angeles
1870s architecture in the United States
Defunct hotels in Los Angeles
Reportedly haunted locations in Los Angeles
Pueblo de Los Ángeles
Hotel buildings on the National Register of Historic Places in California